José Manuel "Pepo" Clavet González de Castejón (born 11 September 1965 in Madrid) is a former tennis player from Spain.

He only played seventeen ATP matches during his professional career, but after retiring from professional tennis, he became a tennis coach. He has previously coached his brother Francisco and fellow countrymen Àlex Corretja, Fernando Verdasco, Tommy Robredo and Feliciano López. He is currently the head coach of Russian player Karen Khachanov.

ATP Challenger and ITF Futures Finals

Singles: 1 (1–0)

Doubles: 4 (2–2)

Notes

External links

José Clavet at the Association of Tennis Professionals Coach Profile

1965 births
Living people
Tennis players from Madrid
Spanish male tennis players
Spanish tennis coaches